Apache 3 is a 3D scrolling shoot 'em up arcade video game released by Tatsumi (and Data East in North America) in 1988. Players control a yellow AH-64 Apache helicopter with weapons and shoot everything in the air and on the ground.

External links

Apache 3 at Arcade History
Contemporary reviews at Solvalou.com
 Apache 3 at Imdb 
 The Arcade Flyer Archive (TAFA): Apache 3 Flyer #47    
 The Arcade Flyer Archive (TAFA): Apache 3 Flyer #3176    
 The Arcade Flyer Archive (TAFA): Apache 3 Flyer #6405    
 The Arcade Flyer Archive (TAFA): Apache 3 Flyer #4225   
 The Arcade Flyer Archive (TAFA): Apache 3 Flyer #4231   

1988 video games
Arcade video games
Arcade-only video games
Helicopter video games
Shoot 'em ups
Tatsumi (company) games
Video games developed in Japan